Immanuel Wilkins (born August 7, 1997) is an American jazz saxophonist.

Life and work 
Wilkins, who is of African American heritage, grew up in the Upper Darby neighborhood of Philadelphia, Pennsylvania. He gained his first musical experiences in his community church, which led him to attend jazz courses at the Clef Club of Jazz and Performing Arts. 

In 2009, as a teenager, he had the opportunity to perform the national anthem before the Philadelphia Eagles game. 

Wilkins studied at the Juilliard School under Bruce Williams, Steve Wilson, and Joe Temperley. 

To date, Wilkins has worked with Jason Moran, Gerald Clayton, Joel Ross, EJ Strickland, David Weiss, Ben Wolfe, the Count Basie Orchestra (Ghost Band), Gretchen Parlato, Solange Knowles, Bob Dylan, Harish Raghavan (Calls for Action, 2019), and Wynton Marsalis. He also contributed to Michael Dease's album, Father Figure (PosiTone, 2015). 

Wilkins led his own band in the late 2010s, performing his own compositions and performing at jazz clubs and venues such as The Jazz Gallery, Smoke, Jamaica Center of Arts and Smalls. 

In 2020, he presented the debut album Omega , which he had recorded with Micah Thomas, Daryl Johns, and Kweku Sumbry.

Wilkins is a member of a quartet with Dezron Douglas, Johnathan Blake, and The Generation Gap and the formations of Philip Dizack and Noam Wiesenberg. He also contributed to Good Vibes' first two albums KingMaker (2019) and Who Are You? (2020), as well as Johnathan Blake's 2021 album, Homeward Bound (2021) and Kalia Vandever's 2022 album, Regrowth.

Discography

As leader 
 Omega (Blue Note Records, 2020)
 The 7th Hand (Blue Note Records, 2022)

As sideman 
 Johnathan Blake, Homeward Bound (Blue Note Records, 2021)
 Michael Dease, Father Figure (Posi-Tone Records, 2016)
 Orrin Evans, The Magic of Now (Smoke Sessions Records, 2021)
 James Francies, Purest Form (Blue Note Records, 2021)
 Giveton Gelin, True Design (2020)
 Harish Raghavan, Calls for Action (Whirlwind Recordings, 2019)
 Joel Ross, KingMaker (Blue Note Records, 2019)
 Joel Ross, Who Are You? (Blue Note Records, 2020)
 Joel Ross, The Parable of the Poet (Blue Note Records, 2022)
 Kalia Vandever, Regrowth (New Amsterdam Records, 2022)
 Noam Wiesenberg, Roads Diverge (Brooklyn Jazz Underground, 2018)
 Dutch Williams, Maaj Paaj (EFFESS Records, 2023)
 Ben Wolfe, Fatherhood (Resident Arts Records, 2019)
 Ben Wolfe, Unjust (Resident Arts Records, 2023)
 Various Artists, Kimbrough (Newvelle Records, 2021)

References

Further reading

External links 
 Webpräsenz
 
 
 In Quest of Spirited Sounds: Immanuel Wilkins Speaks (Interview)

1998 births
Living people
American jazz composers
American jazz saxophonists
21st-century jazz composers
Musicians from Philadelphia
African-American saxophonists